Picture This was an American television program that was broadcast on NBC and hosted by Wendy Barrie. In this 10-minute program, which ran Wednesdays from 8:20pm to 8:30pm ET, guest cartoonists drew cartoons to illustrate jokes or stories submitted by the studio audience. The first episode aired November 17, 1948 and the final episode February 9, 1949. 

The sponsor was Vick Chemical Company, which canceled after 13 weeks. The live program's reach was limited to seven stations on the east coast because at that time CBS had use of the coaxial cable connecting to midwestern stations from 8 to 9 p.m. on Wednesdays.

See also
1948-49 United States network television schedule
The Adventures of Oky Doky (1948-1949) aired on DuMont
The Wendy Barrie Show (1948-1950) aired on ABC, DuMont, NBC

References

External links

1948 American television series debuts
1949 American television series endings
Black-and-white American television shows
NBC original programming
1940s American television series